Rabbi Snir Gueta (born 7 January 1988) is a retired Israeli professional football (soccer) player. 
He previously played for Maccabi Netanya, Hapoel Ashkelon, Maccabi Kiryat Malakhi, Hapoel Asi Gilboa and Maccabi Sha'arayim. At international level, Gueta was capped at under-17 and under-21 level.

Following retirement, he became a rabbi and began lecturing on spiritual awakening, and is advocating for Jews to undergo a process of Tshuva.

Club career statistics
(correct as of May 2013)

References

1988 births
Living people
Israeli Jews
Israeli footballers
Maccabi Netanya F.C. players
Hapoel Ashkelon F.C. players
Maccabi Kiryat Malakhi F.C. players
Hapoel Asi Gilboa F.C. players
Maccabi Sha'arayim F.C. players
Israeli Premier League players
Israeli people of Libyan-Jewish descent
Footballers from Eilat
Israeli rabbis
Association football midfielders